North Utica, often known as Utica, is a village in Utica Township, LaSalle County, Illinois. The population was 1,323 at the 2020 census. It is part of the Ottawa Micropolitan Statistical Area.

While North Utica is the proper name for the city, advertising on nearby Interstates 80 and 39 refers to the village by its original name, Utica. In addition, people who live in the area, official Interstate signage, and signs indicating the city limits all refer to the town as Utica.

History 
The town of Utica had previously been established on the banks of the Illinois River near the Indian village of Kaskaskia during the 1830s, but flooding and the construction of the Illinois and Michigan Canal a few miles north encouraged redevelopment of the village there as North Utica.

2004 tornado 

An F3 tornado struck Utica on April 20, 2004, heavily damaging the downtown business district, causing $8 million in damage and killing 8, with another indirect fatality officially recognized by the village.

Fire at Grand Bear Resort 
A 2022 Memorial Day fire damaged twenty eight privately owned cabins near the entrance to Starved Rock State Park. The Grand Bear lodge, waterpark and a majority of the cabins and villas on site were not affected.

Geography
North Utica is located at  (41.3422775, -89.0142070).

Demographics

As of the 2020 census there were 1,323 people, 449 households, and 330 families residing in the village. The racial makeup of the village was 91.31% White, 0.30% African American, 0.23% Native American, 0.30% Asian, 0.68% from other races, and 7.18% from two or more races. Hispanic or Latino of any race were 5.52% of the population.

There were 449 households, out of which 51.00% had children under the age of 18 living with them, 61.69% were married couples living together, 8.91% had a female householder with no husband present, and 26.50% were non-families. 17.59% of all households were made up of individuals, and 8.24% had someone living alone who was 65 years of age or older. The average household size was 2.89 and the average family size was 2.53.

The village's age distribution consisted of 24.5% under the age of 18, 2.7% from 18 to 24, 21.6% from 25 to 44, 33.8% from 45 to 64, and 17.5% who were 65 years of age or older. The median age was 46.2 years. For every 100 females, there were 92.2 males. For every 100 females age 18 and over, there were 97.2 males.

The median income for a household in the village was $87,946, and the median income for a family was $98,750. Males had a median income of $86,667 versus $38,929 for females. The per capita income for the village was $40,113. About 1.2% of families and 2.7% of the population were below the poverty line, including none of those under age 18 and 6.0% of those age 65 or over.

Attractions 

Local attractions include Grizzly Jack's Grand Bear Resort, Starved Rock Entertainment and Starved Rock State Park. 

Utica is the location of the annual Burgoo Festival on Columbus Day weekend in October. The Burgoo Festival is a fundraising event hosted by the LaSalle County Historical Society.

Notable people 
 Leo Cahill, pro football coach and executive
 George M. Reynolds, Illinois state senator and businessman

References

External links
 
 Starved Rock State Park

Villages in Illinois
Ottawa, IL Micropolitan Statistical Area
Villages in LaSalle County, Illinois